"Just Say When" is a song by American rock band Nothing More. It was their third single off of their album The Stories We Tell Ourselves. It peaked at number 8 on the Billboard Mainstream Rock Songs chart in September 2018.

Background
In December 2017, after Nothing More earned three  Grammy Award nominations, one for the album The Stories We Tell Ourselves (Best Rock Album), and two for its first single, "Go to War" (Best Rock Performance and Best Rock Song), the president of the band's record label, Eleven Seven Music, announced plans to release the track "Just Say When" as a single. This was due to the belief that the softer sound of "Just Say When" was most likely out of the album to appeal outside of the band's core hard rock fanbase and into the alternative rock, indie rock, and pop music radio stations and markets, in an effort to maximize the band's exposure from the Grammy Nominations. While the band would ultimately release the hard rock "Do You Really Want It?" as the album's second single, the band later released "Just Say When" as the third single. The song, alongside an accompanying music video, was released on April 27, 2018. The video was directed by Daniel Cummings and recorded at El Paso International Airport. The video involves a man chasing after a woman, catching up to her, slow dancing with her, only to have one fall to their knees while the other ends up running away. A lyric video had also previously been released in August 2017, as a promotional effort prior to the album's release.

Themes and composition
Frontman and lyricist Johnny Hawkins described the song as being about his emotionally difficult divorce.

Musically, the song was described as an outlier for the band and album; while much of their music has a heavier, hard rock sound, the song was described as an acoustic ballad, consisting of just vocals, acoustic guitar, and strings, and having a pop punk ballad influence.

Personnel
Band 

Jonny Hawkins – lead vocals
Mark Vollelunga – guitar, backing vocals
Daniel Oliver – bass, keyboards, backing vocals
Ben Anderson – drums

Addition musicians and Production

 Ryan Delahoussaye - strings 
 Tony Rodgers - cello 
Will Hoffman - production

Charts

References

Nothing More songs
2018 singles
2018 songs
2010s ballads
Rock ballads